Kelly Rosen (born 23 November 1995) is an Estonian women's association football, who plays as a midfielder for Naiste Meistriliiga club Flora Tallinn and the Estonia women's national football team.

References

1995 births
Living people
Estonian women's footballers
Estonia women's international footballers
Women's association football midfielders
FC Flora (women) players